Perejil may refer to:

 Perejil Island, an islet between Spain and Morocco
 Parsley Massacre, the genocide in which the pronunciation of "perejil" was used as a shibboleth